The National Security Act is a South Korean law enforced since 1948 with the avowed purpose "to secure the security of the State and the subsistence and freedom of nationals, by regulating any anticipated activities compromising the safety of the State." However, the law now has a newly inserted article that limits its arbitrary application.
"In the construction and application of this Act, it shall be limited at a minimum of construction and application for attaining the aforementioned purpose, and shall not be permitted to construe extensively this Act, or to restrict unreasonably the fundamental human rights of citizens guaranteed by the Constitution."

In 2004, legislators of the then-majority Uri Party made a gesture to annul the law, but failed in the face owing to Grand National Party opposition. Some poll results in 2004-2005 from the media cartel informally dubbed Chojoongdong show that more than half of the Korean people are against the abolition of the act and, so, the dispute continues.

The South Korean constitution guarantees freedom of speech, press, petition and assembly for its nationals. However, behaviors or speeches in favor of the North Korean regime or communism can be punished by the National Security Law, though in recent years prosecutions under this law have been rare.

Purpose
The "anti-government organizations" law aims to suppress have the character of "a domestic or foreign organization or group which uses fraudulently the title of the government or aims at a rebellion against the State, and which is provided with a command and leadership system."

In other words, the law made communism illegal. To that end, all of the following were made illegal: recognition of North Korea as a political entity; organizations advocating the overthrow of the government; the printing, distributing, and ownership of "anti-government" material; and any failure to report such violations by others. It has been reformed and strengthened over the past few decades, with the Anti-communism Law being merged with it during the 1980s.

According to certain analysts, the National Security Act can be viewed as a product of the Cold War and the national division of Korea. After World War II, Korean politics was polarized between left and right by the Cold War, forcing Koreans to adopt the ideology of being left or right. This created “one nation-two states” on the Korean peninsula. The resulting tension culminated in the Korean War between 1950 and 1953.

This law has been acknowledged by some politicians, scholars, and activists as a symbol of the anti-communism of South Korea's dictatorial First Republic and a potential restriction on freedom of speech since the law not only regulates activities that directly threaten the safety of the State but also punishes those who praise or incite an anti-state group. Indeed, according to a report written by Amnesty International, the most widely used clause of the National Security Act is:

Administration
The South Korean High Court has a ruling history since 1978 that has classified 1,220 books and print material as "Enemy's Expressions" by force of precedence. Two state-established research institutes decide what books and print materials meet the criteria of "Enemy's Expressions": the Democratic Ideology Institute, established in 1997 under the direct orders of the Chief Prosecutor, and the Public Safety Affairs Institute of the Korea National Police University.

In 2012, a South Korean man, Park Jung-geun, was indicted and charged under the National Security Law for reposting altered North Korean propaganda on social media. The man, who described his use of the material as intended to lampoon the North Korean regime, received a ten-month suspended prison sentence.

Military
During the Lee Myung-bak government, some South Korean military officers were arrested for suspected pro-North Korean or pro-communist activities.

Controversies 

This law restricts the activities of anti-capitalist socialist parties or pro-North Korean parties in South Korea. Therefore, the law has been criticized by liberals for dampening the freedom of party activities.

Some scholars and international organizations also have negative view towards the law. Some argue that National Security Act has been justifying the violation on human rights under the name of defense against the perceived threat of North Korea and that it functions as an obstacle for peaceful reunification with North Korea.

Amnesty International reported that 90 people were charged under the law in 2011, increasing by 95.6% between 2008 and 2011. It described the National Security Act as a tool to "harass and arbitrarily prosecute individuals and civil society organizations who are peacefully exercising their rights to freedom of expression, opinion and association" and to "remove people who are perceived to threaten established political views, to prevent people from taking part in discussions surrounding relations with North Korea."

In 1998, Ha Young-joon, a graduate student at Hanyang University formerly active with the International Socialists movement, was tried and sentenced to 8 months in prison for having summarized and made available online Chris Harman and Alex Callinicos's main writings on South Korea's national BBS network, in violation of NSA Article 7 Clauses 1 and 5.

In 2002, a new recruit in the South Korean Army surnamed Lee, was sentenced to two years in prison for having said to fellow soldiers, "I think Korean separation is not the fault of the North Koreans but the Americans." The Military Prosecutor's Office could not charge him for his comment alone, but it searched the recruit's civilian home and found various illicit books and charged him in violation of the NSA under Article 7, Clauses 1 and 5.

In 2012, Ro Su-hui was arrested after he returned from an unauthorized visit to North Korea. The arrest was described by NK News as "a clear but unnecessary propaganda victory" for North Korea.

Other well-known uses of the National Security act include the 1999 banning of the students' union Hanchongryun and the 2003 spy case against Song Du-yul, a Korean living in Germany. The severest penalty that could be given according to NSL is the death penalty. The best-known example of death penalty is in People's Revolutionary Party Incident.

On 12 June 2011, the South Korean government officially apologized to the family members of South Korean citizen, Kim Bok-jae who was wrongfully accused of being a spy for North Korea under the NSA.
On 15 August 2011, the South Korean government officially apologized to a 54-year-old South Korean citizen, Ku Myeong-u (구명우) who was wrongfully accused of being a spy for North Korea by working in a Chongryon-affiliated company in Japan.
On 23 September 2011, the Seoul High Court officially apologized to Zainichi Koreans Kim Jeong-sa (김정사) and Yoo Seong-sam (유성삼) who were wrongfully accused as spies during the Zainichi Korean Spy Incident.
On 10 October 2011, the Changweon Regional Court formally posthumously apologized to the now-deceased Lee Sang-cheol (이상철) who was a South Korean fisherman who was kidnapped by North Koreans for one year but was wrongfully accused as a spy by the regional prosecutors.
On 10 November 2011, the Supreme Court made a decision that the South Korean government should compensate the 33 individuals who were involved in the 1982 .
On 25 December 2011, the Gwangju High Court issued an apology to two South Korean fishermen (one deceased) with the last names of Kim and Lee who were wrongfully accused for being North Korean spies during the fourth and the fifth republic.
On 22 May 2012, the Supreme Court of South Korea issued an apology to the deceased Byeon Du-gab (변두갑) who was wrongfully arrested for allegedly spying for a North Korean spy in 1970.

Criticism
The Journalists Association of Korea made an official statement in 2007 that the National Security Act reduced the status of South Korea to "a third world country" due to its infringement of human rights. Rhyu Si-min of the People's Participation Party was interviewed by the Pyeonghwa Bangsong radio and criticized the existence of the NSA as "a 60 year old political tool" of public oppression. Louisa Lim of the American NPR also criticized the increased use of the NSA under the Lee Myung-bak government. One of the 33 victims of the Osonghoe Incident, Chae Gyu-gu, said that "the National Security Act must disappear" in order to prevent innocent South Korean citizens from being falsely accused.

See also

Defensive democracy
Peace Preservation Law (Japan)
Patriot Act (United States)
Communist Control Act (United States)
McCarthyism 
Government of South Korea
Politics of South Korea
Division of Korea
Uri Party - This party was the only (historical) liberal ruling party in South Korea that has ever tried to abolish the NSA.
Labor Party (South Korea) - South Korea's few existing socialist political party that do not violate the National Security Law.
National Intelligence Service (South Korea)

References

 Park(박), Jae-kyu(재규) (2009-06-07). "Time to change Security Act". Yonhap News.

External links
 Full text of the National Security Law in English (an unofficial translation)
 McCarthyism, South Korea-style 
 SOUTH KOREA: Rising attacks on rights defenders under the National Security Act (Asian Human Rights Commission)
 South Korea's National Security Law: A Tool of Oppression in an Insecure World

Politics of South Korea
Anti-communism in South Korea
Law of South Korea
1948 in law